Ura (Uramät) is a Papuan language  spoken in East New Britain Province on the island of New Britain, Papua New Guinea. Uramät is the autonym of the people.

References

Languages of East New Britain Province
Baining languages